Hit! is a 1973 action film directed by Sidney J. Furie and starring Billy Dee Williams and Richard Pryor.  It is about a federal agent trying to destroy a drug zone after his daughter dies from a heroin overdose.

An alternate title for the film was Goodbye Marseilles.

Plot summary
The film opens on two separate storylines intercut with each other. In Marseille, a man and his girlfriend board a yacht. He retrieves a bundle of opium attached to a sea buoy and delivers it to a man in a chateau who processes the opium into heroin. The chateau man transfers the processed heroin to the ringleader who takes it to the docks and hides the drugs inside bicycle frames designated for transport to the U.S. In Washington, D.C., Jeannie Allen gets picked up for school by her boyfriend. After school, Jeannie’s boyfriend buys some heroin and injects Jeannie with it. She has a fatal overdose.

Nick Allen is horrified to visit his daughter's grave. He tracks down the drug dealer who sold the heroin and nearly beats him until the dealer convinces Nick that the real villains are the ones supplying him. The Director of Nick's unnamed federal agency offers his condolences over Jeannie’s death and suggests an easy assignment to get Nick’s mind off the tragedy. Nick suggests instead going after the head of the heroin ring. Nick’s supervisor wants nothing to do with the conversation and washes his hands of Nick.

Nick assembles a team of outcasts by pressuring each in different ways. Agent Dutch Schiller is near retirement and frustrated that his violent tactics get drug pushers released back onto the streets. Nick convinces him to go to France and reconnoiter on the drug cartel. Nick offers an addict prostitute, Sherry Nielson, a daily supply of dope. He also enlists Barry Strong, a former military sniper by pressuring him on his unpaid taxes. Mike Willmer is a former Navy sailor whose wife was raped and killed by a junkie. Elderly Ida & Herman have mysterious backgrounds in clandestine operations and they had a son who died from drug addiction.

The Director of Nick’s agency sends two goons, Carlin & Crosby, to assassinate Nick, but he escapes and hurries his team to a hideout in the fictitious coastal town of Hamilton Point, British Columbia. Dutch presents all the intelligence he’s gathered on the heroin operation and identifies nine targets, claiming that the cartel will collapse if they are killed. The team trains for a week before heading to Marseille where they carry out their operation.

Herman kills his target with a shotgun in a movie theater as the man watches The Godfather. Ida stabs hers in the bathroom at a restaurant. Mike shoots the yachtsman with a speargun as he tries to retrieve another package of opium. Barry and Dutch drive straight onto the grounds of the chateau and shoot the opium processor. Sherry poses as a waitress and poisons another leader of the ring. Sherry, in practice runs, initially has problems committing this crime in the crucial alotted time,  primarily because she's in heat. Mike convinces Nick to sleep with Sherry to tinge her hormones and she then commits the murder successfully. Barry and Sherry go to a fashion house and assassinate two other ringleaders there. Meanwhile, Nick poses as a gas serviceman digging a new trench for a pipe at the mansion. He kills his target with a bazooka.

The Director confronts Nick after the operation is complete and offers a solution to coverup what happened, claiming the French are furious at the U.S. Nick sees through the ruse and says that the Director is furious because Nick showed how easy it was to destroy the cartel with a ragtag team. The Director threatens to have Nick killed. Nick smiles and leaves.

Cast
 Billy Dee Williams as Nick Allen
 Richard Pryor as Mike Willmer
 Paul Hampton as Barry Strong
 Gwen Welles as Sherry Nielson
 Warren J. Kemmerling as "Dutch" Schiller
 Janet Brandt as Ida
 Sid Melton as Herman
 Zooey Hall as Carlin
 Todd Martin as Crosby
 Norman Burton as The Director
 Jenny Astruc as Mademoiselle Frelou
 Yves Barsacq as Romain
 Jean-Claude Bercq as Jean-Baptiste
 Henri Cogan as Bornou
 Pierre Collet as "Zero"
 Tina Andrews as Jeannie Allen, Nick's Daughter

Production
Many of the people, both cast and crew, involved in this film had previously worked on Lady Sings the Blues (1972).

The F/V Victory, which Richard Pryor is seen piloting, was supposed to be blown up, with money being offered to owner Donald Gillich (who actually steered the boat from the pilot house below) for a replacement. Gillich however shot the producers down, saying he didn't want his family's boat destroyed.

The role of Nick Allen was originally written for Steve McQueen.

Reception
Vincent Canby of The New York Times wrote, "It's a movie out for kicks, but the kicks are so implausible, so humorless, so without redeeming style and wit, that to sit through it is to give oneself a false low." Variety faulted the film for "illogical plotting" and a too-long running time that "allows for some tedium," but praised "a charismatic dimension to Williams' leading performance, some tautly edited and dramatically photographed action setpieces and some nifty comic business deftly handled by Furie," as well a "consistently excellent supporting cast." Gene Siskel of the Chicago Tribune gave the film three stars out of four, writing that it "isn't going to win any prizes for originality," but nevertheless provides "solid entertainment and should be a box office smash." Charles Champlin of the Los Angeles Times wrote that "at the level of calculated make-believe it was seeking, the movie succeeds extremely well. It is a big, long (two hours and a quarter), richly glossy international crime adventure, a generally suspenseful piece of storytelling centering on the strong and sympathetic performance of Billy Dee Williams in the lead role."

Home media
Hit! was released to DVD by Olive Films (under license from Paramount Pictures) on April 24, 2012.

See also
 List of American films of 1973

References

External links
 
 
 

1973 films
1970s crime action films
American crime action films
Films directed by Sidney J. Furie
Films scored by Lalo Schifrin
Films about the illegal drug trade
Films set in Marseille
Films about the French Connection
1970s English-language films
1970s American films